Michael Behrmann (born 1 December 1966) is a German field hockey coach. At the 2012 Summer Olympics he coached the Germany women's national field hockey team.

References

Living people
1966 births
German field hockey coaches
Place of birth missing (living people)
21st-century German people